The Guyanan red howler (Alouatta macconnelli) is a species of howler monkey, a type of New World monkey, native to Suriname, Guyana, Trinidad, French Guiana, Venezuela and Brazil.

References

Guyanan red howler
Mammals of the Caribbean
Mammals of Trinidad and Tobago
Mammals of Brazil
Mammals of Venezuela
Mammals of Guyana
Mammals of French Guiana
Mammals of Suriname
Guyanan red howler
Taxa named by Daniel Giraud Elliot